Scopula amazonata is a moth of the  family Geometridae. It is found in the Amazon region.

References

Moths described in 1858
amazonata
Moths of South America